Huangkeng (黄坑) may refer to the following locations in China:

 Huangkeng, Fujian, town in Jianyang
 Huangkeng, Nanxiong, town in Guangdong
 Huangkeng, Renhua County, town in Guangdong
 Huangkeng Township, Suichuan County, Jiangxi